David M. Peters (born March 1, 1954 in Hartford, Connecticut) is an American politician who represented the 6th Worcester District in the Massachusetts House of Representatives from 1991 to 1998. From 1995 to 1997 he was the Minority Whip and from 1997 to 1999 he was the House Minority Leader. Peters was appointed Commissioner of the Division of Fisheries, Wildlife & Environmental Law Enforcement on December 12, 1998 and held that job until he was replaced by incoming Governor Mitt Romney in 2003.

References

1954 births
Republican Party members of the Massachusetts House of Representatives
People from Charlton, Massachusetts
Bryant University alumni
Living people
Politicians from Hartford, Connecticut